The 16th AVN Awards ceremony, organized by Adult Video News (AVN) honored the best of 1998 in pornographic movies and took place on January 9, 1999, at Bally's Las Vegas, Las Vegas, Nevada. During the ceremony, AVN presented AVN Awards in 68 categories. The ceremony, televised by Playboy TV, was produced by Gary Miller and directed by Mark Stone. Comedian Robert Schimmel returned as host and actresses Alisha Klass, Midori and Serenity co-hosted the award show. Five weeks earlier in a ceremony held at the Westin Bonaventure in Los Angeles, California, on December 4, 1998, the awards for gay pornographic movies were presented in a new separate ceremony known as the  GayVN Awards.

Looker won six awards including Best Film. Other winners included Café Flesh 2 with four awards, Tushy Heaven with three and Euro Angels 10, Forever Night, Masseuse 3, Models, Pornogothic, The Pornographer, Strange Life: The Breech, Tatiana each with two.

Winners and nominees 

When the nominees for the 16th AVN Awards were announced, Café Flesh 2 earned the most nominations with 14; Models came in second place with 13. A new committee of 51 industry professionals voted to select the best in each category. There were 30 AVN voters.

The winners were announced during the awards ceremony on January 9, 1999. Besides winning Best Film, Looker's awards haul also included wins for Best Actress to Shanna McCullough, who won her first acting award 12 years earlier, and Best Director—Film to Nic Cramer, his second in consecutive years. Co-host Klass won Best New Starlet with Tom Byron and Chloe winning Male and Female Performer of the Year awards respectively. Erotic X-FIlm Guide suggested that with gonzo porn making a mark for itself in hardcore, the Best Gonzo Video and Best Gonzo Series awards, won by Whack Attack 2 and Seymore Butts respectively, were "perhaps the most important this past year."

Awards 
Winners are listed first and highlighted in boldface.

Performances

Sex Scenes

By Genre 
{| class=wikitable
|-
! style="background:#89cff0; width:50%" | Best All Sex Film
! style="background:#89cff0; width:50%" | Best All Sex Video
|-
| valign="top" |
 High Heels
 Delirious
 Wet
 Wicked Cover Girls
 Delirious
| valign="top" |
 Fresh Meat 5
 Beyond Reality 5
 Depraved Fantasies 5
 Dream Catcher
 Eros
 Forever Night
 Hustler's Pool Party
 Layered
 Skin: Cuntrol
 Spellbinders
|-
! style="background:#89cff0; width:50%" | Best Gonzo Video
! style="background:#89cff0; width:50%" | Best Vignette Tape
|-
| valign="top" |
 Whack Attack 2
 Anabolic World Sex Tour 16
 Ben Dover's British Housewives Fantasies
 Bodyslammin' 2: Down & Dirty
 Buttman in Budapest
 Essentially Juli
 Party Girls
 Tom Byron's Cumback Pussy 10
 The Voyeur 11
| valign="top" |
 Sodomania 24
 Dogtales
 Gang Bang Auditions
 Hustler Presents: Love Letters
 Perverted Stories 16
 Puritan Video Magazine 20
 S.M.U.T. 4
 Tails of Perversity 4
 Wet Spots
 White Trash Whore 9
 Whore Stories
 Wired for Sex
|-
! style="background:#89cff0; width:50%" | Best Anal-Themed Feature
! style="background:#89cff0; width:50%" | Best Comedy
|-
| valign="top" |
 Tushy Heaven
 Anal Examiner
 Assman 4
 Asswoman in Wonderland
 Ben Dover's Crack Attack
 Booty Duty 2
 Buttholes Are Forever
 Lewd Behavior: 2nd Offense
 Lord of Asses
 Only the A Hole
 Planet of the Gapes 2
 Rectal Rooter
 Rocco's True Anal Stories
 Sean Michaels' Up Your Ass 7
| valign="top" |
 The Pornographer
 Date From Hell
 Hanky Panky
 Homey in the Haystack
 The Kiss
 Nude World Order
 Nurse Sadie
 Nurses To the Rescue
 Porno News
 Sudden Passions
 Terrors From the Clit
 Thai Me Up
|-
! style="background:#89cff0; width:50%" | Best All-Girl Feature
! style="background:#89cff0; width:50%" | Best Alternative Video
|-
| valign="top" |
 Welcome to the Cathouse
 Buttslammers 16
 Eat at the Pussy Café
 Girls Home Alone 4
 Nasty Girls 18
 No Man's Land 20
 San Francisco 69'ers
 Shane's Slumber Party 2
 Violation of Marylin Star
 Where the Boys Aren't 10
| valign="top" |
 Memorial Weekend T & A '98, Vol. 2
 Buttman At Nudes-A-Poppin' 5
 Hellcats in High Heels
 Nude Paradise Club #224 Vol. 2
 Jenna Exposed
 Naked at the Lake
 Penthouse Love Games
 Playboy's Playmates Revisited
 Playboy Video Centerfold: 1998 Playmate of the Year
 Strip Shop
 Sweetheart Murders
 Taoist Sexuality: Energy, Elements, Ecstasy
|-
! style="background:#89cff0; width:50%" | Best CD-ROM
! style="background:#89cff0; width:50%" | Best DVD
|-
| valign="top" |
 Days of Oblivion
 Betty Page
 Supermodels 2
 Virtual Sex With Farrah
| valign="top" |
 Shock
 Bodyslammin' 2: Down & Dirty
 Conquest
 Debbie Does Dallas: The Next Generation
 Dream Catcher
 Jeff Stryker's Underground
 New Wave Hookers 5
 Night Trips
 Penetrator 2
 The Pyramid 1, 2 & 3
 Secrets of the Kama Sutra
 Zazel
|-
! style="background:#89cff0; width:50%" | Best Ethnic-Themed Video
! style="background:#89cff0; width:50%" | The Hot Video Award
|-
| valign="top" |
 Dinner Party at Six
 Black Erotic Moments 6
 Black Street Hookers 12
 Ebony Muff Divers
 Freaks, Whoes & Flows
 Ho' In
 Inner City Black Cheerleader Search 22
 Isis Blue
 Manhattan Black
 My Baby Got Back 15
 Sugar Walls 6
 Tokyo Summer Camp Girls
 24•7, Vol. 9
 Wonton Workers| valign="top" |
(France's Hot Video magazine presents its award for Best American Production Released in France)
 Drop Sex Buda
 Café Flesh 2
 Control
 Cumback Pussy 6
 Models
 One Track Mind
 Queen's Challenge
 Zazel
|-
! style="background:#89cff0; width:50%" | Best Foreign Release
! style="background:#89cff0; width:50%" | Best Foreign Vignette Tape
|-
| valign="top" |
 Tatiana 1, 2 & 3 Aphrodite: Goddess of Love
 Citizen Shane
 Debauchery
 Fatal Orchid 1 & 2
 Light My Fire
 Planet Sexxx
 Profession: Porn Actress
 Rocco Never Dies 1 & 2
 Sinful Desires 1 & 2
 The Temptation of Clarisse
 That$ Life 2
| valign="top" |
 Euro Angels 10 Avena Extra Edition: Hungarian Style, Issue 2
 Euro Angels 2
 Euro Angels 3
 Euro Angels 8
 Lee Nover 6
 Lil' Women: Vestal Virgins 3
 No Mercy
 Ritch Bitch
 Triple X Files: Adele
 Triple X Files: Katya Kean
|-
! style="background:#89cff0; width:50%" | Best Oral-Themed Feature
! style="background:#89cff0; width:50%" | Best Pro-Am or Amateur Tape
|-
| valign="top" |(Tie) Blowjob Fantasies Coed Cocksuckers 7 The Blowjob Adventures of Dr. Fellatio 5
 The Blowjob Adventures of Dr. Fellatio 10
 Coed Cocksuckers 6
 Cock Smokers
 Deep Throat: The Quest Begins
 In the Mouths of Babes
 Interracial Fellatio 2
 It Don't Matter Just Don't Bite It 3
 Shut Up and Blow Me!
 Shut Up and Blow Me! 2
| valign="top" |
 The Coeds 44 Adventures in Pantyland 1
 Amateurs Only 90
 Amateur USA 4
 Beaver Hunt 3
 The Clean Up Woman
 The Coeds 44
 Fresh Faces 19
 Global Warming Debutantes 11
 Homegrown Video 500
 More Dirty Debutantes 90
 Triple X Amateur 86
 Up and Cummers 54
 Up and Cummers 56
 Video Virgins 40
|-
! style="background:#89cff0; width:50%" | Best Specialty Tape—Big Bust
! style="background:#89cff0; width:50%" | Best Specialty Tape—Bondage
|-
| valign="top" |
 Big Tit Betrayal Big Boob Bangeroo 11
 Boobsville Cabaret
 Brown Sugar Babes 2
 Chloe's Big Tit Conquests
 Dirty Deeds
 Double D Dolls 6
 Natural Wonders of the World
 Stacked: Titanic Tits
 Stacked 2: Nightmare in Titsville
 Wild Wild Chest 6
| valign="top" |
 Uncut Abduction of Chloe
 Authentic Divas: Brutal Submission
 The Boiler Room
 Dark Paradise
 Doomsday
 Dresden Diary 18
 Extreme Tit Torture
 I Spit on Your Slave
 Leather Bound Dykes from Hell 10
 Raging Pain
 Summer and Skye's Bondage Party
 Tokyo Torture Chamber
 Valentine's Day Massacre
 Whipped Wet
|-
! style="background:#89cff0; width:50%" | Best Specialty Tape—Other Genre
! style="background:#89cff0; width:50%" | Best Specialty Tape—Spanking
|-
| valign="top" |
 Strange Life: The Breech Babes Ballin' Boys 4
 Barefoot Confidential
 Bend Over Boyfriend
 Box of Laughter: Dueling Pages
 Every Woman Has a Foot Fantasy
 Hardcore Male-Female Oil Wrestling 2
 Hot 50+ Two
 Latin Plump Humpers
 Leg Sex Dream
 Leg Sex Fantasy
 Little Anal Granny: Back to College
 Nina Hartley's Guide to Sex Toys
 Toe Tales 52
 2000 Lbs. of Love
| valign="top" |
 C.P. Research Institute The Caning 2
 Discipline Daze II
 Lingerie Models Spanked
 Hotel Service
 Mistress Tara's Finishing School
 Spank Master 4
|-
! colspan="2" style="background:#89cff0" | Best Transsexual Tape
|-
| colspan="2" valign="top" |
 The Big-Ass She-Male Adventure Cocks 'n Frocks 6
 Mommy Queerest
 Real Transsexuals
 Sex Changes
 Sexual Transsexuals 2

 That Darn Tranny
 The Tranny-Sylvanians
 Trans-Asian
 Transsexual University: Cheerleader Ed.|}

 Marketing 

{| class=wikitable
|-
! style="background:#89cff0; width:50%" | Best Box Cover Concept
! style="background:#89cff0; width:50%" | Best Packaging
|-
| valign="top" |
 Castle of Lucretia (In-X-Cess International) The Art of Bondage (M. Zabel Productions)
 Afterglow (Wicked Pictures)
 Best Friends (Vivid Video)
 Café Flesh 2 (VCA Platinum Plus)
 Eros (Wicked Pictures)
 Phoenix Rising (Pleasure Limited Editions)
 The Rear Arrangers (Sterling Pictures)
 Skin: Cuntrol (Eurotique Entertainment)
 Skin 13 (Eurotique Entertainment)
 Thai Me Up (Cal Vista Video/Metro)
 Vortex (VCA Platinum Plus)
 Wicked Cover Girls (Wicked Pictures)
| valign="top" |
 Exile (Wicked Pictures) Beautiful Evil (Sin City Ultra)
 Date From Hell (Wicked Pictures)
 Fantasy Lane (Vivid Film)
 Flashflood 2 (Coast to Coast Video)
 Heartache (Wicked Pictures)
 Intimate Exposure (VCA Platinum Plus)
 The Look (Vivid Film)
 Looker (Pleasure Limited Editions)
 Mobster's Wife (Vivid Film)
 No Man's Land 20 (Video Team)
 Pornogothic (Wicked Pictures)
 Thrust Fault (VCA Platinum Plus)
 Words of Lust (Klimaxxx Productions)
|-
! style="background:#89cff0; width:50%" | Best Overall Marketing Campaign—Individual Title or Series
! style="background:#89cff0; width:50%" | Best Overall Marketing Campaign—Company Image
|-
| valign="top" |
 Flashpoint (Wicked Pictures) Cape Sin (Sin City Ultra)
 Eros (Wicked Pictures)
 Janine & Vince Neil • Hardcore & Uncensored (IEG/S&D Video)
 Nude World Order (Sin City Ultra)
 One Size Fits All (Adam & Eve Productions)
 Pam & Tommy Lee • Hardcore & Uncensored (IEG/S&D Video)
 Pornogothic (Wicked Pictures)
 Sexy Nurses 3 (Cal Vista Video/Metro)
| valign="top" |
 Wicked Pictures Elegant Angel Video
 Evil Angel Productions
 Metro, Inc.
 Odyssey Group Video
 Sin City Entertainment
 VCA Pictures
 Video Team
 Vivid Video
 Zane Entertainment Group
|}

 Series 

{| class=wikitable
|-
! style="background:#89cff0; width:50%" | Best Continuing Video Series
! style="background:#89cff0; width:50%" | Best Ethnic-Themed Series
|-
| valign="top" |
 White Trash Whore (JM Productions/Legend) 18 and Nasty (Devil's Films/IVC)
 24•7 (Fat Dog Productions)
 Cherry Poppers: The College Years (Zane Entertainment Group)
 Nina Hartley: How To (Adam & Eve Productions)
 Nineteen Video Magazine (Dane Productions/Forbidden Films)
 No Man's Land (Video Team)
 PickUp Lines (Odyssey Group Video)
 Screw My Wife, Please (Tight Ends Productions)
 S.M.U.T. (Elegant Angel Video)
 Wet Cotton Panties (CDi Entertainment Group)
| valign="top" |
 Inner City Black Cheerleader Search (Woodburn/IVC) Black Dirty Debutantes (Ed Powers Productions)
 Black Street Hookers (Devil's Films/IVC)
 Bootylicious (JM Productions/Legend)
 Chocolate Covered Cherry Poppers (Zane Entertainment Group)
 Freaks, Whoes & Flows (Jake Steed Productions)
 My Baby Got Back (Video Team)
 Nasty Video Magazine (Video Team)
 Players Video Magazine (Players Video/Vivid Raw)
 Sista (Video Team)
 Sugar Walls (Dark Side/Elegant Angel)
 Sweet Honey Buns (West Coast Productions)
|-
! style="background:#89cff0; width:50%" | Best Gonzo Series
! style="background:#89cff0; width:50%" | Best Pro-Am or Amateur Series
|-
| valign="top" |
 Seymore Butts (Seymore Butts Home Movies) Anabolic World Sex Tour (Anabolic Video)
 Assman (Anabolic Video)
 Ben Dover (HK Video/VCA)
 Buttman (Evil Angel Productions)
 Butt Row (All Blew Shirts/Evil Angel)
 Dirty Dancers (Fallen Angel Entertainment)
 Fresh Hot Babes (West Coast Productions)
 Freshman Fantasies (All Good Video)
 Real Sex Magazine (Legend Video)
 Shane's World (Odyssey Group Video)
 Sweet Rides (All Good Video)
 Up Your Ass (Anabolic Video)
 The Voyeur (John Leslie/Evil Angel)
 Wet Cotton Panties (CDi Entertainment Group)
| valign="top" |
 Up & Cummers (Randy West/Evil Angel) Amateurs Only (Fat Dog Productions)
 Beaver Hunt (Hustler Video/Vivid Raw)
 The Coeds (Sunny Day Productions)
 Creme de la Face (Odyssey Group Video)
 Cum Stoppers (Legend Video)
 Global Warming Debutantes (Ed Powers Productions)
 Homegrown Video (Xplor Media Group)
 Hot Fucking Amateurs (Pleasure Nastiest Moments)
 More Dirty Debutantes (Ed Powers Productions)
 Mother Productions (Mother Productions)
 Private Moments (GRG)
 Real Life Video (Real Life Video)
 Slut Search (Tight Ends Productions)
 Video Virgins (New Sensations)
|}

 Technical Achievement 

{| class=wikitable
|-
! style="background:#89cff0; width:50%" | Best Art Direction—Film
! style="background:#89cff0; width:50%" | Best Art Direction—Video
|-
| valign="top" |
 Tatiana
 Delirious
 High Heels
 Looker
 Love's Passion
 Mobster's Wife
 Phoenix Rising
 Shattered Vows
| valign="top" |
 Pornogothic
 Café Flesh 2
 Dark Paradise
 Dream Catcher
 Eros
 Flashpoint
 Forever Night
 Generation Sex 4
 Infinite Bliss
 Sexual Species
 Skin: Cuntrol
 Terrors From the Clit
|-
! style="background:#89cff0; width:50%" | Best Cinematography
! style="background:#89cff0; width:50%" | Best Videography
|-
| valign="top" |
 Jack Remy – Looker
 Andrew Blake – Delirious
 Andrew Blake – High Heels
 Andrew Blake – Wet
 A. C. Fremont – White Angel
 Jake Jacobs – The Good, the Bad and the Wicked
 Kris Kramski – Models
 Ralph Parfait – Mobster's Wife
 Ralph Parfait – Motel Blue
 Ralph Parfait, Jack Remy – Masseuse 3
 Jack Remy – Phoenix Rising
 Cyril Yano, Barry Wood – Love's Passion
| valign="top" |
(Tie)
 Jack Remy – Café Flesh 2
 Barry Wood – Forever Night
 Antony Adams – Planet Sexxx
 Tom Elliott – Generation Sex 4
 Tashi Gold, Simon Poe – Skin: Cuntrol
 Barry Harley, Dino Ninn, Predator – Dream Catcher
 Jake Jacobs – Eros
 Jake Jacobs – Exile
 Jake Jacobs, Jack Remy – Flashpoint
 Joone – Rocki Roads' Wet Dreams
 Jack Remy – Penitent Flesh
 Barry Wood, Predator – Fade to Blue
|-
! style="background:#89cff0; width:50%" | Best Director—Film
! style="background:#89cff0; width:50%" | Best Director—Video
|-
| valign="top" |
 Nic Cramer – Looker
 James Avalon – Carnal Instincts
 Veronica Hart – Love's Passion
 Kris Kramski – Models
 Bud Lee – Appassionata
 Paul Thomas – Masseuse 3
| valign="top" |
 John Leslie – The Lecher 2
 Brad Armstrong – Flashpoint
 François Clousot – L.A. Uncovered
 Teri Diver, Tom Elliott – Generation Sex 4
 Tashi Gold – Skin: Cuntrol
 Ernest Greene – Dark Paradise
 Jonathan Morgan – Pornogothic
 Michael Ninn – Dream Catcher
 Antonio Passolini – Café Flesh 2
 Jim Powers – Chamber of Whores
 Jace Rocker – Thai Me Up
 Candida Royalle – One Size Fits All
 David Stanley – Turn About
 Matt Zane – Lust and Lies
 Michael Zen – Taboo 17
|-
! style="background:#89cff0; width:50%" | Best Director—Foreign
! style="background:#89cff0; width:50%" | Best Music
|-
| valign="top" |
 Rocco Siffredi – Rocco Never Dies I & II
 Karel C. – Journey Through My Heart
 Christoph Clark – The Temptations of Clarisse
 Marc Dorcel – Citizen Shane
 Anita Rinaldi – Planet Sexxx
 Frank Thring – Broken Dreams
 Pierre Woodman – Tatiana 1, 2 & 3| valign="top" |
 Razed in Black – Strange Life: The Breech Johnny Toxic, Weed Whore – Action Man
 Asia Carrera – Appassionata
 Pantisi Sera – Café Flesh 2
 Benedictus – The Craving
 PPM, Inc. – Depraved Fantasies 5
 Lauren Alexander – Dream Catcher
 Tom Elliot, Marc Allan, Rook – Generation Sex 4
 Raoul Valve – High Heels
 Vittorio Worx – Looker
 Melvin – Penitent Flesh
 The Long Beach Dub All-Stars – Porno Star
 Toshi Gold – Skin: Cuntrol
 Razed in Black – Strange Life: The Breech
 Nine-Inch Male – Welcome to the Cathouse
 Ivory Gibson – White Angel
|-
! style="background:#89cff0; width:50%" | Best Editing—Film
! style="background:#89cff0; width:50%" | Best Editing—Video
|-
| valign="top" |
 SCSi Post, Nic Cramer – Looker Gabrielle Anex, Phil Leader – White Angel
 Andrew Blake – Delirious
 Andrew Blake – High Heels
 Evan Daniels – Carnal Instincts
 Steven Katz – Love's Passion
 Kris Kramski – Models
 Joe Kurtz – Masseuse 3
 Jon Raven, Nic Cramer, Kelly Carpenter – Phoenix Rising
 SCSi Post, Nic Cramer – Intimate Strangers
 Motel Blue
| valign="top" |
 Alex Sanders – Bodyslammin': Shake & Tumble Keith Brian – Thai Me Up
 Tom Byron – Whack Attack 2
 Robyn Dyer – Layered
 Tom Elliott – Generation Sex 4
 Steven Katz – Dream Catcher
 Joe Kurtz – Mission Erotica
 John Leslie – The Lecher 2
 Michael Ninn – Fade to Blue
 Antonio Passolini, D-3 – Café Flesh 2
 Simon Poe – Skin: Cuntrol
 Tom Ponti – Planet Sexxx
 Alex Sanders – Bodyslammin' 2: Down & Dirty
 SCSi Post – Heartache
 Bud Swope – Nude World Order
|-
! style="background:#89cff0; width:50%" | Best Screenplay—Film
! style="background:#89cff0; width:50%" | Best Screenplay—Video
|-
| valign="top" |
 Martin Brimmer, Nic Cramer – Looker James Avalon – Carnal Instincts
 James Avalon – White Angel
 James Avalon, Bella Feege – Red Vibe Diaries 2
 A. J. Barber – Mobster's Wife
 Asia Carrera – Appassionata
 Nic Cramer – Phoenix Rising
 Jane Hamilton – Love's Passion
 L. Meyers – Party Favors
 Raven Touchstone – Debbie Does Dallas: The Next Generation
 Neil Wexler – Masseuse 3
| valign="top" |
 Mark Archer – Barefoot Confidential Brad Armstrong – Exile
 Brad Armstrong – Heartache
 Brad Armstrong, George Kaplan – Flashpoint
 Martin Brimmer – No Man's Land 21
 Martin Brimmer – Pornogothic
 Guillermo Brown – The Neighbor
 George Kaplan – Dinner Party at Six
 Cash Markman – Contract
 Cash Markman – Forbidden
 Antonio Passolini – Café Flesh 2
 Jim Powers – Chamber of Whores
 Jace Rocker – Thai Me Up
 Candida Royalle – One Size Fits All
 David Stanley – Turn About
|-
! colspan="2" style="background:#89cff0" | Best Special Effects
|-
| colspan="2" valign="top" |
 Café Flesh 2 Bodyslammin': Shake & Tumble Bodyslammin' 2: Down & Dirty Dream Catcher Flashpoint Forever Night Generation Sex 4 Layered Phoenix Rising Terrors From the Clit|}

 Achievement Awards 

 Breakthrough Award 

 Alex Sanders

 Safe Sex Award 

 One Size Fits All – Femme Productions/Adam & Eve

 Special Achievement Awards 

 Larry Flynt, LFP
 Sharon Mitchell, AIM
 Shane, Shane's World
 Eddie Wedelstedt, Goalie Entertainment
 Greg Allan

 Hall of Fame 

 Lasse Braun
 Nikki Charm
 Bob Chinn
 Diedre Holland
 Tami Monroe
 Richard Pacheco
 Suze Randall
 Patti Rhodes
 Annie Sprinkle

 Best-Selling Tape of the Year 
 Pam & Tommy Lee•Hardcore & Uncensored, S & D Video/IEG

Best-Renting Tape of the Year 

 Pam & Tommy Lee•Hardcore & Uncensored, S & D Video
o/I EG

 Movies with multiple nominations and awards 

The following 22 movies received the most nominations:

The following 11 movies received multiple awards:

 Presenters and Performers 

The following individuals presented awards or performed musical numbers.

 Presenters 

 Performers 

 Ceremony information 

For 1999, "a decision was made to reinstate the mainstream portion of the technical awards et al. in one evening's presentation" because for the first time, awards for gay movie categories were split off into a new event, the GayVN Awards, which were held a month earlier. Previously, technical and some other categories were presented separately from the awards show; with them included, the 1999 show ran four hours.

Gary Miller was producer of the show and comedian Robert Schimmel was selected for a second consecutive stint as host. Several other people participated in the production of the ceremony and its related events. Mark Stone served as musical director for the festivities. John Leslie, who won his fourth Best Director statuette at the event, and who led a blues band in his spare time, performed a self-composed song as one of the musical performers.

The award show kicked off with presentation of the Best Couples Sex Scene—Film award, with the winners announced as Stephanie Swift and Jon Dough. Erotic X-Film Guide magazine reported this was a faux pas: "Stephanie went to the podium to get her award and swore that she did not have sex with Jon Dough in the video. In fact, it was true and was a misprint in the program."

 Box office performance of nominees 
The Pam & Tommy Lee • Hardcore & Uncensored celebrity sex tape won the awards for Best Selling Tape and Best Renting Tape, presented to Steven Hirsch on behalf of S&D Video and IEG.

 Critical reviews 
The show received a mixed reception from sex publications. Hustler magazine reported, "Accused of rigging its voting process to favor its advertisers in the past, Adult Video Newss judges restored luster to the proceedings this year by bestowing awards to deserving nominees." However, the magazine noted co-host Klass managed "to shock the ceremony's seen-it-all, heard-it-all organizers by repeatedly expressing her fondness for" anal sex.

Erotic X-FIlm Guide was critical of the show's length: "We realized this was indeed the longest and most drawn out show AVN had ever produced. As much as the industry likes to pat itself on the back and as much as we love AVN for giving us the porn equivalent of the Oscars, the show must go on. But only if it's edited with a merciless sword. Something must be done to make one of the most anticipated nights in porn not be one of the most dreaded."

See also 

 AVN Awards
 AVN Best New Starlet Award
 AVN Award for Male Performer of the Year
 AVN Award for Male Foreign Performer of the Year
 AVN Female Performer of the Year Award
 List of members of the AVN Hall of Fame
 1999 GayVN Awards
 1998 in film
 71st Academy Awards

References

Notes

Further reading 
 
 }
 }
 }

External links 

 
 Adult Video News Awards, USA: 1999 Internet Movie Database
  
 
 
 

AVN Awards
1998 film awards
1999 in Nevada
AVN Awards 16